NAR 1 or just NAR (Serbian Nastavni Računar, en. Educational Computer) was a theoretical model of a computer created by Faculty of Mathematics of University of Belgrade professor Nedeljko Parezanović (In Serbian:Недељко Парезановић).  It was used for Assembly language and Computer architecture courses.

Specifications
NAR 1 processor has a 5-bit address bus (32 bytes of addressable memory) and 8-bit data bus. Machine instructions were single-byte with three most significant bits specifying the opcode and 5 least significant bits the parameter - memory address. A single 8-bit accumulator register was available and there were no flags or flag registers. Only absolute addressing mode was available and all others were achieved by self-modifying code. 

Even though this is only a theoretical computer the following physical characteristics were given:

 Memory cycle: 1μs
 Arithmetic operation (SABF) cycle: 0.9μs (900ns)
 Control panel facilitates power on and off, memory data entry and readout, instruction counter entry and selection of either program execution mode or control panel mode.

Instruction coding and set
 SABF (001aaaaa, sr. , en. Add Fixed point) loads the content of memory location specified by the address parameter, adds it to the current value of the accumulator and stores the result into the accumulator
 PZAF (010xxxxx, sr. , en. Change the sign of the accumulator in fixed point) Negates the fixed point (such as integer) value in the accumulator
 AUM (011aaaaa, sr. , en. Accumulator Into Memory) stores the content of the accumulator into memory location specified by the address parameter
 MUA (100aaaaa, sr. , en. Memory Into Accumulator) loads the content of memory location specified by the address parameter into the accumulator
 NES (101aaaaa, sr. , en. Negative Jump) performs a conditional jump to the address specified by the parameter if the current value of the accumulator is negative
 ZAR (110xxxxx, sr. , en. Stop the Computer) stops any further processing.

Two more instructions were not specified but were commonly present in simulators and took instruction codes 000aaaaa and 111aaaaa:
 BES (sr. , en. Unconditional Jump) performs an unconditional jump to the address specified by the parameter
 NUS (sr. , en. Zero Jump) performs a conditional jump to the address specified by the parameter if the current value of the accumulator is zero

Example programs
A sample program that sums up an array of 8-bit integers:

00:     0         ; input: 0 or value 22, output: result
01..21: 0,0,0...  ; input: values 1..21
22:     MUA  0    ; Start of program; Load accumulator from address 0
23:     SABF 1    ; Add value from address 1 to accumulator
24:     AUM  0    ; Store accumulator to address 0
25:     MUA  23   ; Load instruction at address 23 (SABF)
26:     SABF 31   ; Add value from address 31 (+1) to accumulator
27:     AUM  23   ; Store accumulator to address 23 (modifies SABF instruction)
28:     SABF 30   ; Add value from address 30 to accumulator
29:     NES  22   ; Jump back to 22 if accumulator value is negative
30:     ZAR  10   ; Stop the computer. Argument makes this byte have the value of -(SABF 22) = -54.
31:     1         ; Value to add to address in each iteration

Above program adds up to 22 8-bit values if executed from address 22:
 Values 1-21 stored at locations 1-21
 Value 22 stored at location 0, instead of the constant 0 and will be replaced by the result

NAR 1 programs are commonly self-modifying. Unlike in some other architectures, this is not a 'trick'. As memory can not be addressed by a register, the only way to dynamically manipulate memory data is to modify memory manipulation instructions. Above example also contains a typical trick to save memory - instruction (at address 30) is reused as data by another instruction (at address 28).

If initial accumulator value can be controlled from the control pane, a 23rd value can be stored in it. Above program has to be only slightly modified - instruction SABF 1 at address 23 has to be changed to SABF 0 and the program should be executed from that address (23) and not from 22.

Other tricks included the use of the changes of the sign after instruction is modified, as shown in the following example:

00..21: 0,0,0...  ; input values 22 to 1
22:     0         ; input: 0 or value 23, output: result
23:     MUA  21   ; start of program; Load (next) value
24:     SABF 22   ; Add subtotal at 22 to accumulator
25:     AUM  22   ; Store new subtotal to 22
26:     MUA  23   ; Load instruction 23 into accumulator
27:     SABF 31   ; Decrement instruction by 1
28:     AUM  23   ; Update instruction
29:     NES  23   ; Repeat if the instruction is still negative
30:     ZAR       ; Otherwise, stop the computer
31:     -1        ; Constant needed for instruction at 27

Here the instruction "MUA 21" at address 23 has the binary value 10010101, which is -107 decimal when treated like signed integer in two's complement. Instructions at addresses 26, 27 and 28 decrement this value by 1 in each iteration. This will modify the 5 least significant bits specifying the address and will not touch the three bits indicating the instruction until that instruction becomes MUA 0 (10000000 binary = -128 decimal, negative). Once this is decremented by one it becomes 01111111 (+127 decimal) which is no longer negative and will cause the jump-if-negative instruction at 29 to pass, proceeding to "stop the computer" at 30.

Similarly to above, this program can add between 22 and 24 values, depending on whether address 22 can be used for both input and output and whether initial value of the accumulator can be used as input (the program should then be executed from address 24 and instruction at 23 should be MUA 22).

If particular implementation stops the computer if it encounters an unknown opcode or it implements additional unconditional jump instruction with opcode "111aaaaa", then such behaviour can be used as follows:

00..22: 0,0,0...  ; input values 23 to 1
23:     0         ; input: 0 or value 24, output: result
24:     MUA  22   ; start of program; Load (next) value
25:     SABF 23   ; Add subtotal at 23 to accumulator
26:     AUM  23   ; Store new subtotal to 23
27:     MUA  24   ; Load instruction 24 into accumulator
28:     SABF 31   ; Decrement instruction by 1
29:     AUM  24   ; Update instruction
30:     NES  24   ; Repeat if the instruction is still negative
31:     -1        ; BES 31 or invalid instruction & constant for instruction at 28

Above, the value of "-1" found at address 31 can either be treated as invalid instruction causing the computer to stop or as unconditional jump (BES 31) to the same address, resulting in infinite loop that does not affect the result (control panel can be used to display it).

Finally, depending on whether it is decided that a computer will stop program execution if it reaches the end of memory (address 31, will not roll back to address 0), above program can be reorganized to take one value more by eliminating the need for "stop the computer" instruction altogether, as follows:

00..22: 0,0,0...  ; input values 23 to 1
23:     0         ; input: 0 or value 24, output: result
24:     -1        ; Constant needed for instruction at 29
25:     MUA  22   ; start of program; Load (next) value
26:     SABF 23   ; Add subtotal at 23 to accumulator
27:     AUM  23   ; Store new subtotal to 23
28:     MUA  25   ; Load instruction 25 into accumulator
29:     SABF 24   ; Decrement instruction by 1
30:     AUM  25   ; Update instruction
31:     NES  25   ; Repeat if the instruction is still negative
; ------------- end of memory

Trivia
 Word "nar" means Teaching computer model
 Many NAR 1 simulators were created. One was named "Šljiva" (en. plum) as that fruit grows in Serbia, while "nar" does not.
 One of frequently given task was to create a program that adds as many numbers as possible, having those numbers stored in 32-byte memory along with the program.
 Some assembly language protocols are derived from the NAR1 khulil code

See also
 NAR 2
Prof.dr Nedeljko Parezanovic (in Serbian)

Models of computation